Hista fabricii is a moth in the Castniidae family. It is found in Brazil. It mainly occurs in the southern and south-eastern parts of the country, in areas of the Atlantic Forest.

The length of the forewings is 34 mm for males and 42 mm for females. The forewings are dark brown with two or three hyaline (glassy) spots at the apex. The hindwings are reddish orange with an extradiscal spotband resembling a spiral. Adults are on wing from September to April.

There are some records of larvae foraging in Tillandsia aeranthos, but the food plant is unknown. Pupation takes place in the ground at the base of trees covered with epiphytic Bromeliaceae.

Subspecies
Hista fabricii fabricii (Brazil)
Hista fabricii boisduvalii (Walker, 1854) (Brazil)
Hista fabricii papagaya (Westwood, 1877) (Brazil)

Etymology
The specific epithet is a tribute to Johan Christian Fabricius (1745-1808).

References

 ; ;  2010: Revision of Hista Oiticica (Lepidoptera: Castniidae) and discussion on the validity of its subspecies. Zootaxa, 2421: 1–27. Preview

Moths described in 1823
Castniidae